The 1990 Copa del Rey was the 54th edition of the Spanish basketball Cup. It was organized by the ACB and its Final Eight was played in Las Palmas, in the Centro Insular de Deportes between 10 and 13 February 1990.

This edition was played by the 24 teams of the 1989–90 ACB season. The eight first qualified teams of the previous season qualified directly to the Round of 16.

First round
Teams #2 played the second leg at home.

|}

Round of 16

|}

Final Eight Bracket

Final
After eliminating Real Madrid Otaysa in the previous semifinal, CAI Zaragoza beat RAM Joventut in the Final for achieving its second Cup. Mark Davis scored 44 points, the highest performance in a Copa del Rey Final.

This was the first final without Real Madrid and FC Barcelona since 1968.

MVP of the Tournament: Mark Davis

References

External links
Boxscores at ACB.com 
Linguasport

Copa del Rey de Baloncesto
Copa